Cheltenham Girls High School, is a public, comprehensive, high school for girls, located in Cheltenham, a suburb on the Upper North Shore of Sydney, New South Wales, Australia. 
 
Established in 1957 and operated by the New South Wales Department of Education and Training, the school has a non-selective enrolment policy and currently caters for approximately 1,260 students from Years 7 to 12.

In the 2006 Higher School Certificate, the National Education Directory of Australia named Cheltenham Girls High School the sixth best performing school, and the best non-selective public school in Sydney's Hornsby region.

The school is well-known for its distinctive pink uniform has recently celebrated their 60th anniversary.

History
Cheltenham Girls High School was founded in 1957–1958 by Bessie Mitchell who also acted as the first Principal. The School is located on the former residential estate of the Vicars family, who had donated the land for the only purpose of building a school. A leadlight window from the original house is now situated in the administration foyer, as well as a larger window of a ship being located in the E block. The ship is used in the header of the school newsletter, Yarrabee

The first students of the school were accommodated at Epping Boys' High School buildings during 1957, as the school was still in the process of being built. The Epping boys playground was separated, one side for the girls, one for the boys. The boys were caned if they were seen in the girl's playground. These students finally moved to new buildings on the Cheltenham site in 1958 and comprised four classes of second-year students and 10 classes of first-year students.
A common myth associated with the school is that the colour of the uniform comes from a bequest, the terms of which stated that the uniform must be pink. In fact, it was not Bessie Mitchell as some think, who decided the uniforms should be pink dresses; it was the Vicars family who previously owned the land. These dresses are still worn today and are noted throughout the area.

One highlight of the Cheltenham school year is the annual Presentation Day, which is held at the Sydney Opera House each year. The majority of students, staff and parents travel to Circular Quay station in a special train reserved for this occasion (the "Cheltenham Express"). At this Presentation Day, students sing Handel's 'Hallelujah' chorus and a chosen other song (such as Pharrell Williams' 'Happy') as an ensemble. This performance requires several lessons' worth of time to practice as a school and has been conducted on Zoom meetings in recent years or through lipsyncing due to the COVID-19 pandemic.

Curriculum
Cheltenham Girls' High School is registered and accredited with the New South Wales Board of Studies, and therefore follows the mandated curriculum for all years. The school provides two years of compulsory subjects (Years 7–8); two years of compulsory subjects, plus three elective subjects for the School Certificate (Years 9–10); and two years preparing for the Higher School Certificate (HSC) (Years 11–12). In Years 11 and 12, a minimum of 12 units Preliminary and 10 units HSC must be studied, with English the only mandatory subject. The school also offers two accelerated course for selected students, the subject are IPT, and Aboriginal Studies. Additional courses are also available through TAFE NSW, the Open High School, Saturday School of Community Languages and other providers.

The school is a comprehensive high school, and typically performs well in the HSC, outperforming some public selective schools. In the 2006 HSC, the National Education Directory of Australia named Cheltenham Girls the sixth best performing school, and the best non-selective public school in Sydney's Hornsby region.

House system
Students are divided alphabetically into six house groups. School carnivals in swimming athletics and cross country are organised on a house basis. There are also sport prefects mostly from the senior years, but a few from the juniors in each sport house that lead the houses into house and school spirit chants and organise house meetings and do various jobs.  The houses are:

Bookoola (light blue) — "Wise Owl"
Mirrabooka (dark blue) — "Southern Cross"
Coolaroo (yellow) — "Stars"
Petarli (white and black) — "The Moon"
Dulkara (red) — "Rainbow"
Wirreanda (green) — "Tall Trees"

In the earlier days of the school, there were only two houses in the colours of green and a darker green.

Student Leadership

School prefects are elected from year 11 by staff and peers in years 10 to 12 in June each year. The captain, vice-captain and senior prefect are elected by the prefects.

Transport prefects are elected from year 11 and support the safety, welfare and conduct of each student as she travels to and from school. Transport prefects report misbehavior, problems etc. to the head teacher welfare.

The SRC is a representative body comprising students from each year 7 through 12. Years 8 to 11 elect their six representatives from a whole year. Each year 7 class elects its own representative and if there happens to be a tie between two people, both of them become a member of the SRC. Elections are held in the first semester(late in Term 1 or early in Term 2). The SRC organises many events, sometimes along with other non-elected student body groups.

Organisations
 P & C Association: Cheltenham's Parents and Citizens' Association takes an interest in the welfare and education of its students. The annual general meeting of the P&C takes place at the beginning of each school year and regular meetings are held each term. One highlight of the school year is the annual Art & Craft Show, which is held at the beginning of the second term. This event is run by the P&C and is the major fundraising event for the year.
 Cheltenham Old Girls Association: The Old Girls Association promotes ongoing contact between former students and supports the school with fundraising efforts.
 SRC: this is a panel of girls from each grade in the school who help with raising money for charities and helping girls have their say on what is needed around the school.

Notable alumnae
 Barbara Darling, second woman to become a bishop in the Anglican Church of Australia
 Meredith Oakes, playwright and music critic.
 Louise Robert-Smith, headmistress of Ascham School.
 Christine Piper, writer, Winner of the Australian/Vogel Literary Award for her novel After Darkness. 
 Chris Ronalds AM SC, barrister, author of "Discrimination Law and Practice"
 Greer Skinner, Annette Harada, Angela Blackshaw and Naomi "Batti" Battah, members of ARIA nominated rock band Skulker.
 Kylie Kwong, celebrity chef
 Lily Serna, mathematician and TV presenter, formerly co-host of SBS Television's Letters and Numbers
 Chantelle Kerry, figure skater, ice dancer, Olympian
 Fiona Clifton, previous deputy headmistress of Cheltenham Girls High School
 Monica McDonald, 1988 Olympian, figure skater
 Jenny Coupland, Miss Australia 1982
 Jaclyn Moriarty, bestselling author, freelance Journalist for The Philadelphia Inquirer
 Sophie Ferguson, professional tennis player
 Catherine Cox, netball player 
 Lucille Everett, actress, television presenter
 Julie Goodwin, winner of Masterchef Australia
 Jane Asby, author, writer, essayist
 Beverley Dunn, set decorator, Oscar Award 2014 for The Great Gatsby
 Amy Witting, novelist and poet, winner of the Patrick White Award (1993) and The Age Book of the Year Award (2000), and twice short listed for the Miles Franklin Award (1990 and 2000)
 Thea Astley (taught as Thea Gregson) novelist and poet, four-time winner of the Miles Franklin Award (1962,1965,1972,1999), twice winner of The Age Book of the Year Fiction Award (1975, 1996), OAM 1980, OA 1992.
 Sorrel Wilby, adventurer, author and TV presenter.
 Kate Raison, actor.
 Judith Stove, author.
 Sherine Salama (also studied at Santa Sabina), documentary maker.
 Professor Kaarin Anstey, leading dementia researcher.

See also
 List of government schools in New South Wales

References

External links
 Cheltenham Girls' High School website

Educational institutions established in 1957
Girls' schools in New South Wales
Public high schools in Sydney
1957 establishments in Australia